The Satanic Satanist is the fourth studio album by American rock band Portugal. The Man. The album's artwork is a combination of photographs and watercolor illustrations by lead singer John Gourley.

On June 1, 2009, the band released the song "People Say" for free download on their official website.

On June 24, 2009, the album leaked on the Internet. Lead singer John Gourley posted a blog entry regarding the leak on the band's official website. The statement encouraged fans to download the album, but to also support the band and purchase the record upon release if enjoyed.

On October 1, 2010, the band released onto YouTube a music video for the song "People Say", directed by Michael Ragen and produced by Joy Saez.

This album featured a guest drummer who had been touring with them while Jason Sechrist took a leave of absence from the band.

Track listing

Personnel
Portugal. The Man
John Baldwin Gourley – vocals, guitar, organ, machines
Garrett Lunceford – drums and gang
Ryan Neighbors – piano, rhodes, organ, synth, vocals
Zachary Scott Carothers – bass guitar, percussion, vocals

Additional personnel
Zoe Manville – vocals

Charts

References

2009 albums
Portugal. The Man albums
Albums produced by Paul Q. Kolderie
Equal Vision Records albums